Simms Taback (February 13, 1932 – December 25, 2011) was an American writer, graphic artist, and illustrator of more than 35 books. He won the 2000 Caldecott Medal for U.S. picture book illustration, recognizing Joseph Had a Little Overcoat, and was a runner-up in 1998 for There Was an Old Lady Who Swallowed a Fly.

Biography
He was born to a  working family of a housepainter and a seamstress, socialists and labor organizers. His first name is after Harry Simms, Jewish labor leader. 

Taback graduated from the Cooper Union for the Advancement of Art and served in the United States Army during the Korean War. He was a designer for CBS Records and The New York Times. He was the founder and president of the Illustrators Guild (later the New York Graphic Artists Guild) and taught art at the School of Visual Arts and Syracuse University.

Taback designed the first McDonald's Happy Meal box in 1977. He died in 2011 of pancreatic cancer.

Selected works

 Jabberwocky and other nonsense (Harlin Quist, 1964), three poems by Lewis Carroll, 1871 to 1889
 Too Much Noise (1967), by Ann McGovern
 Joseph Had a Little Overcoat (Random House, 1977), movable book based on a Yiddish folk song
 Jason's Bus Ride (1987), by Harriet Ziefert
 Road Builders (1994), by B. G. Hennessy
 Sam's Wild West Show (1995), by Nancy Antle
 Two Little Witches: a Halloween counting story (1996), by Harriet Ziefert
 There Was an Old Lady Who Swallowed a Fly (1997), illustrating the American folk poem
 Joseph Had a Little Overcoat (Viking, 1999) —the Caldecott Medal-winning edition for U.S. picture book illustration
 This is the House that Jack Built (2002), based on the nursery rhyme
 Kibitzers and Fools: tales my zayda (grandfather) told me (2005), traditional Jewish tales
 I Miss You Every Day (2007)

Original works
Animal Parade
City Animals
Dinosaurs
Farm Animals
Safari Animals
Quack Like A Duck!
Who Am I?
Who Said Moo?
Where Is My Baby?
Where Is My Friend?

Awards

Winner 

 1999: National Jewish Book Award for Joseph Had a Little Overcoat
 2000: Caldecott Medal for U.S. picture book illustration for Joseph Had a Little Overcoat

Finalist 

 1998: Caldecott Medal for U.S. picture book illustration for There Was an Old Lady Who Swallowed a Fly.

See also
Reynold Ruffins

References

External links
Official Simms Taback Website
Official Caldecott Website
Creative Parents Interview
The Horn Book interview with Simms Taback

Caldecott Medal winners
American children's book illustrators
Jewish American artists
Jewish American writers
1932 births
2011 deaths
Deaths from cancer in California
Deaths from pancreatic cancer
21st-century American Jews